Pan American Hospital, now defunct, opened in 1927 at 161 East 90th Street, Manhattan. Its intended purpose was "to serve the Latin-American people through their own Spanish and Portuguese-speaking doctors and nurses."

It closed in 1930.

History
In less than two year after opening, Pan American Hospital was in court regarding whether or not they'd be able to continue operation.

The New York Times editorialized that Pan American Hospital "should be continued" since "through no fault of its own management" the hospital faced financial problems.

Creation of the hospital was encouraged by William Sharpe, "the first president of the Pan-American Medical Association."

References

External links
 history of the 161 East 90th Street building used by Pan American Hospital

Defunct hospitals in Manhattan
Hispanic and Latino American culture in New York City